Lux, King of Criminals (German: Lux, der König der Verbrecher) is a 1929 German silent film directed by Edmund Heuberger and starring Carl Auen, Paul Michelo Kramer and Fred Immler.

The film's sets were designed by the art director Robert A. Dietrich.

Other films with Carl Auen as Lux are The Man in the Dark (1930), Pariser Unterwelt (1930) and Zweimal Lux (1930)

Cast
 Carl Auen as Lux  
 Paul Michelo Kramer as Edgar von Allmen  
 Fred Immler as José  
 Nico Turoff as Rico  
 Carla Bartheel as Madeleine  
 Melitta Klefer as Carlotta 
 Julius Falkenstein 
 Karl Harbacher 
 Lia Hildebrandt 
 Hugo Werner-Kahle

References

Bibliography
 Alfred Krautz. International directory of cinematographers, set- and costume designers in film, Volume 4. Saur, 1984.

External links

1929 films
Films of the Weimar Republic
German silent feature films
Films directed by Edmund Heuberger
German black-and-white films